Dewi Sartika (4 December 188411 September 1947) was an advocate for and pioneer of education for women in Indonesia. She founded the first school for women in the Dutch East Indies. She was honoured as a National Hero of Indonesia in 1966.

Biography
Dewi Sartika  was born to Sundanese noble parents, R. Rangga Somanegara and R. A. Rajapermas in Cicalengka, in Cikalengka on 4 December 1884. As a child, after school she often pretended to be a teacher while playing with her friends. After her father died, she lived with her uncle. She received an education in Sundanese culture while under his care, while her knowledge of Western culture was passed on to her from the wife of a resident assistant. In 1899, she moved to Bandung.

On 16 January 1904, she founded a school named Sakola Istri at Bandung Regency's Pendopo which later was relocated to Jalan Ciguriang and the school name changed to Sekolah Kaoetamaan Isteri (Wife Eminency School) in 1910. In 1912, there were nine Sekolah Kaoetamaan Isteri in cities or regencies in West Java (half of the cities and regencies), and in 1920 all of cities and regencies had one school. In September 1929, this school changed its name to Sekolah Raden Dewi.

She died on 11 September 1947 at Cineam, Tasikmalaya while she was evacuating from Bandung due to the independence war.

Legacy
Her name Dewi Sartika is known as the street that was the place of her school, as well as used in various cities in Indonesia. She was awarded the Order of Orange-Nassau at the 35th anniversary of Sekolah Kaoetamaan Isteri as a tribute to her service in education. On 1 December 1966, she received Heroine of the National Movement title.

Personal life
In 1906, she married Raden Kanduruhan Agah Soeriawinata, a teacher at Sekolah Karang Pamulang.

Tribute 
On 4 December 2016, Google celebrated her 132nd birthday with a Google Doodle.

References

Bibliography

 
 
 

1884 births
1947 deaths
National Heroes of Indonesia
Indonesian feminists
Indonesian educators
Indonesian women educators
Indonesian women's rights activists
People from Bandung Regency
Sundanese people
Women's rights in Indonesia